Arthur Kronfeld (January 9, 1886 – October 16, 1941) was a German psychiatrist of Jewish origin, and eventually a professor at the University of Berlin. His sister Maria Dronke found fame as an actor in New Zealand.  Later in life, Kronfeld took up an important position in Moscow.  On 10 October 1936, an exchange between Kronfeld and fellow exiled German-Jewish psychiatrist, James Lewin, was recorded in the proceedings of a meeting of the Moscow Society of Neuropathology and Psychiatry.  

In 1941, he wrote the pamphlet "Degenerates in Power", in which he made psychiatric diagnoses for Hitler and his associates, and also participated in anti-fascist programs on Moscow radio. It is believed Kronfeld and his wife committed suicide at the approach of German troops. However, there is some controversy on exactly how they died.

Works

Books
(Titles translated)
1906 Sexuality and aesthetic feeling in their genetic connection. A study. Singer, Strasbourg and Leipzig
1912 About the psychological theories of Freud and related opinions - Systematics and critical discussion. Engelman, Leipzig (Russ. Transl.: Moscow 1913)
1920 The nature of psychiatric realization. Contributions to General Psychiatry. Springer, Berlin
1924 Hypnosis and Suggestion. Ullstein, Berlin (row: Ways to the knowledge Nr.11; Transl.: Leningrad 1925, Moscow 1927; Prague 1931; Tallinn 1991)
1924 Psychotherapy - Characterology, Psychoanalysis, Hypnose, Psychagogik. Springer, Berlin (2. impr. and enl. Edition 1925)
1927 Psychology in Psychiatry - An introduction to the psychological realization ways within the psychiatry and their position for clinical-pathological research. Springer, Berlin (Habilitation thesis; engl. 1936);
1930 Perspectives of Psychiatry. Thieme, Leipzig
1932 Textbook of Characterology. Springer, Berlin
1932 with S. Wronsky (and collaboration of Rolf Reiner): Social therapy and Psychotherapy in the methods of the welfare service. Heymann, Berlin
1941 Degenerates in power, Moscow and Krasnojarsk; with the title: The bloody gang of the degenerated also Swerdlowsk 1942. - Reprint Moscow 1993.

Editorship
1922-1927 Kleine Schriften zur Seelenforschung (Small writings for soul research). Puettmann, Stuttgart (briefly carried on with the title Writings for soul research by Carl Schneider in 1928)
1934-36/37 with Wilhelm Stekel: Psychotherapeutische Praxis (Psychotherapeutic practice - quarterly for practical medical Psychotherapy) Weidmann, Vienna

Notes

External links
 
 More extensive Bibliography
Some articles about (see also: Lecture Nr.78 of the Session 26. "Ethics and Justice" here)

 Entrance in Exil-Archiv (in German - with special references to the history of literature)
 Arthur Kronfeld zur Erinnerung zur Gelegenheit seines 100. Geburtstages am 9.1.1986; Translations:
In memory of Arthur Kronfeld on occasion of his 100. birthday in 1986
Arthur Kronfeld à la mémoire (in prep.)
Памяти Артура Кронфельда (Артур Кронфельд) (see also 120-Летие Артура Кронфельда)
 Kronfelds relationship to Magnus Hirschfeld (see also here  and here)
 Facts to the history of the first general medical congresses for psychotherapy in Germany 1926-1931
 About the first periodical for general psychotherapy in Germany (in German)
Albert Einstein - with his second wife and a near relative - in an parapsychological experimental event organized by the Berliner Aerzliche Gesellschaft für Parapsychische Forschung in February 1930 with collaboration of Arthur Kronfeld ("4. Fall") Record of the proceeding starting on p.. 608 here to p. 610; Survey)
 Dringender Appell - historical important 'urgent appeal' - of the ISK 1932 (also here - sharper by enlargement)

German psychiatrists
19th-century German Jews
Physicians from Berlin
1941 suicides
1886 births
Joint suicides
Suicides in the Soviet Union
Suicides by Jews during the Holocaust